Plague-House Puppet Show is the second studio album by Twilightning, released November 16, 2004, on the label Spinefarm Records.

Track listing 
 "Plague-House Puppet Show" (Ville Wallenius) – 04:19 
 "Into Treason" (Tommi Sartanen) – 05:07     
 "The Fiend" (Wallenius) – 04:23        
 "Victim of Deceit" (Sartanen) – 04:11       
 "Painting the Blue Eyes" (Wallenius) – 04:31 
 "In the Fervor's Frontier" (Wallenius) – 04:56 
 "Fever Pitch" (Wallenius) – 03:49        
 "Diamonds of Mankind" (Sartanen) – 04:56
 "Riot Race" (Wallenius) – 05:27 
 "Lubricious Thoughts" (Wallenius) – 05:13
 "Goddess of Fortune" (Japanese Bonus Track) - 05:07
 "Wind-up Toy" (Alice Cooper cover) - 04:37

Personnel
Tommi Sartanen – Guitars
Ville Wallenius – Guitars
Jussi Kainulainen – Bass guitars
Juha Leskinen – Drums
Heikki Pöyhiä – Vocals
Mikko Naukkarinen – Keyboards

References

2004 albums
Twilightning albums
Albums with cover art by Jean-Pascal Fournier